Burmese Braille is the braille alphabet of languages of Burma written in the Burmese script, including Burmese and Karen.  Letters that may not seem at first glance to correspond to international norms are more recognizable when traditional romanization is considered.  For example,  s is rendered  th, which is how it was romanized when Burmese Braille was developed (and is how it often still is romanized); similarly  c and  j as  s and  z.

History 

The first braille alphabet for Burmese was developed by Father William Henry Jackson ca. 1918.<ref> [Note: source says "circa 1914", but Jackson did not arrive in Burma until November 1917]</ref> There was no provision for the voiced aspirate series of consonants (gh, jh, dh, bh), nor for the retroflex (tt etc.), and Jackson provided distinct letters for complex onsets such as ky, hm and for various syllable rimes (ok, ein, aung, etc.), with no regard to how they are written in the print Burmese alphabet. These aspects have all been changed, as have several of the letters for the values which were retained.

 Charts 

Print letters
The letters in print Burmese transcribe consonants and, in syllable-initial position, vowels.  The consonants each have a corresponding letter in braille, but the initial (stand-alone) vowels in print are in braille all written  plus the letter for the appropriate diacritic (see next section).  The consonant ny has two forms in print which are distinct in braille as well.

{| class="wikitable" style="text-align:center;"
|-
! Braille
|  ||  ||  ||  ||   
|  ||  ||  ||  ||   
|-
! Print
|  ||  ||  ||  || 
|  ||  ||  ||  || 
|-
! Roman
| k || kh || g || gh || ng
| c || ch || j || jh || ny
|-
! colspan=11| 
|-
! Braille
|  ||  ||  ||  ||   
|  ||  ||  ||  ||   
|-
! Print
|  ||  ||  ||  || 
|  ||  ||  ||  || 
|-
! Roman
| tt || tth || dd || ddh || nn
| t || th || d || dh || n
|-
! colspan=11| 
|-
! Braille
|  ||  ||  ||  ||   
|  ||  ||  ||  ||   
|-
! Print
|  ||  ||  ||  || 
|  ||  ||  ||  || 
|-
! Roman
| p || ph || b || bh || m
| y || r || l1 || w || s
|-
! colspan=11| 
|-
! Braille
|   ||  ||  
| 
| rowspan=3 colspan=5| 
|  
|-
! Print
|  ||  || 
| rowspan=2| (initialvowel)
| 
|-
! Roman
| h || l || '
| -ny-
|}

Stacked consonants
That is, Burmese Braille has two viramas, one corresponding to print virama (see next section), and one corresponding to stacking. For example,  kambha'' "world" is written .

Print diacritics
The diacritics in print, which transcribe both vowels and consonants, are rendered as follows in Karen Braille.

 is used to mark syllable- or word-initial vowels, which have distinct letters in the Burmese print alphabet.  For example,

Numbers
Burmese numerals are represented as follows:

Punctuation
The following punctuation is specific to Burmese.  (See Burmese alphabet#Punctuation for an explanation.)  Western punctuation presumably uses Western braille conventions.

References

French-ordered braille alphabets
Burmese language